Dame Sarah Patricia Connolly  (born 13 June 1963) is an English mezzo-soprano. Although best known for her baroque and classical roles, Connolly has a wide-ranging repertoire which has included works by Wagner as well as various 20th-century composers. She was appointed a Commander of the Order of the British Empire (CBE) in the 2010 New Year Honours and a Dame Commander of the Order of the British Empire (DBE) in the 2017 Birthday Honours for services to music.

Life
Connolly was born in County Durham and educated at Queen Margaret's School, York, Clarendon College in Nottingham and then studied piano and singing at the Royal College of Music, of which she is now a Fellow. She then became a member of the BBC Singers for five years.

Career
Connolly's interest in opera and a full-time career in classical music began after she left the BBC Singers. She began her opera career in the role of Annina (Der Rosenkavalier) in 1994. Her breakthrough role was as Xerxes in the 1998 English National Opera production of Handel's Serse (Xerxes), directed by Nicholas Hytner.

In 2005, she sang the title role in Handel's Giulio Cesare for Glyndebourne Festival Opera. The DVD of the production, directed by David McVicar, won a Gramophone Award. Singing the part of Sesto in McVicar's production of La Clemenza di Tito for English National Opera in 2006, Connolly was nominated for an Olivier Award. Her 2005 debut at the Metropolitan Opera was in the same opera, but in the role of Annio.

In 2009, she sang (in Purcell's Dido and Aeneas) at Teatro alla Scala and made her debut at the Royal Opera House, Covent Garden as Dido in the same opera. In 2010, she made her role debut of "Der Komponist" in Ariadne auf Naxos at the Metropolitan Opera. She was awarded the 2011 Distinguished Musician Award from the Incorporated Society of Musicians. For her recital at Alice Tully Hall in New York, Connolly received a rave review in The New York Times.

She made her debut as Fricka in Wagner's Der Ring des Nibelungen (Royal Opera House) and earlier that year she sang Phèdre in Rameau's Hippolyte et Aricie (Paris Opéra at the Palais Garniér). Connolly reprised Phèdre for Glyndebourne Festival Opera in a production by Jonathan Kent 2013, conducted by William Christie.

Connolly won the Silver Lyre 2012 from the Royal Philharmonic Society for Best Solo Singer and was nominated in the Best Female Singer category in the inaugural International Opera Awards held in London in 2013, and she was the recipient of the 2013 Most Outstanding Achievement in a Main Role for WhatsOnStage Opera Poll as Octavian in Der Rosenkavalier with English National Opera.

During the 2011 Gustav Mahler celebrations, Connolly performed all of his vocal works in the UK and abroad with the Philharmonia and Maazel, the LPO and Jurowski and Nezet Séguin, the LSO with Alsop, the OAE with Rattle and the Leipzig Gewandhaus Orchestra under Chailly. She sang in the opening concert of the BBC Promenade Concerts of 2012, televised from the Royal Albert Hall, also performing Tippett's A Child of our Time later in the series. She is committed to promoting new music; her performances include Sir John Tavener's Tribute to Cavafy at the Symphony Hall, Birmingham and his film music to Children of Men.

Connolly made the first commercial recording of Mark-Anthony Turnage's Twice Through the Heart with Marin Alsop and the London Philharmonic Orchestra having previously given the Belgian and Dutch premieres of the work with the Schoenberg Ensemble conducted by Oliver Knussen. She sang the role of Susie in the premiere production of Turnage's opera The Silver Tassie at English National Opera in 2000.

Connolly's other commercial recordings include Schumann lieder with Eugene Asti for Chandos, "Songs of Love and Loss", Korngold lieder with Iain Burnside, the Duruflé Requiem for Signum and Purcell's Dido and Aeneas with the Orchestra of the Age of Enlightenment for which she raised the funds and selected the cast for the recording.

In September 2009, Connolly made her first appearance as a guest soloist at The Last Night of the Proms, singing Rule, Britannia! while wearing a replica Royal Navy uniform of Lord Nelson.

She was awarded an honorary Doctor of Music degree by Nottingham Trent University in 2017.

In July 2019 she announced temporary leave to undergo breast cancer surgery withdrawing from upcoming performances in BBC Proms and Orpheus and Eurydice with English National Opera.

Personal life
Connolly lives with her husband and their daughter in Gloucestershire.

Operatic roles

Royal Opera House
George Enescu
 Oedipe (Jocaste)
Henry Purcell
 Dido and Aeneas (Dido)
 Richard Wagner
 Das Rheingold (Fricka)
 Die Walküre (Fricka)
 Tristan und Isolde (Brangäne)

Welsh National Opera
Richard Strauss
 Ariadne auf Naxos (Der Komponist)

Opera North
Gaetano Donizetti
 Maria Stuarda (Maria)
Vincenzo Bellini
 I Capuleti e i Montecchi (Romeo)

English National Opera
Vincenzo Bellini
 I Capuleti e i Montecchi (Romeo)
Alban Berg
 Lulu (Geschwitz)
Hector Berlioz
 Les Troyens (Dido)
Benjamin Britten
 The Rape of Lucretia (Lucretia)
Marc-Antoine Charpentier
 Medea (Medea)
George Frideric Handel
 Alcina (Ruggiero)
 Agrippina (Agrippina)
 Ariodante (Ariodante)
 Semele (Ino)
 Serse (Serse)
Claudio Monteverdi
 L'incoronazione di Poppea (Empress Ottavia)
Wolfgang Amadeus Mozart
 La clemenza di Tito (Sesto) – 2006 Laurence Olivier Award nomination for Outstanding Achievement in Opera
Henry Purcell
 Dido and Aeneas (Dido)
Richard Strauss
 Der Rosenkavalier (Octavian)
Mark-Anthony Turnage
 The Silver Tassie (Susie)

Scottish Opera 
 Richard Strauss: Der Rosenkavalier (Octavian)

Glyndebourne Festival Opera 
 George Frideric Handel: Giulio Cesare (Giulio Cesare)
 Johann Sebastian Bach: St. Matthew Passion
 Richard Wagner: Tristan und Isolde (Brangäne)
 Rameau: Hippolyte et Aricie (Phèdre)
 Brett Dean: Hamlet (Gertrude)

Opéra National de Paris
 Handel: Giulio Cesare (Sesto)
 Rameau: Hippolyte et Aricie (Phèdre)

La Scala, Milan 
 Henry Purcell: Dido and Aeneas (Dido)

Maggio Musicale, Florence 
 Claudio Monteverdi: L'incoronazione di Poppea (Nerone)

La Monnaie, Brussels
 Henry Purcell: Dido and Aeneas (Dido)

De Nederlandse Opera
Handel
 Giulio Cesare (Giulio Cesare)
 Ariodante (Ariodante)

Liceu, Barcelona
Monteverdi
 L'incoronazione di Poppea (Nerone)
Handel
 Agrippina (Agrippina)
Wagner
 Tristan und Isolde (Brangäne)

Festival d'Aix-en-Provence
Mozart
 La Clemenza di Tito (Sesto)
Handel
 Ariodante (Ariodante)

Bavarian State Opera, Munich
 Britten: Rape of Lucretia (Lucretia)
 Gluck: Orfeo ed Euridice (Orfeo)

Bayreuth Festival
 Richard Wagner
 Das Rheingold (Fricka)
 Die Walküre (Fricka)

Festspielhaus Baden-Baden
 Richard Wagner
 Tristan und Isolde (Brangäne)

Vienna State Opera
George Frideric Handel
 Ariodante (Ariodante)

Roles in the United States 
New York City Opera
 Vincenzo Bellini: I Capuleti e i Montecchi (Romeo)
 George Frideric Handel: Ariodante (Ariodante)
 George Frideric Handel: Xerxes (Xerxes)
Metropolitan Opera
 Wolfgang Amadeus Mozart: La clemenza di Tito (Annio)
 Richard Strauss: Ariadne auf Naxos (The Composer)
 Richard Strauss: Capriccio (Clairon)
San Francisco Opera
 George Frideric Handel: Semele (Ino and Juno)

Recordings

Recordings include:

Gustav Mahler Das Lied von der Erde - PENTATONE, 2020
 Henry Purcell "Dido and Aeneas" Chandos/OAE, 2009
 Frank Bridge Orchestral Songs Chandos/BBCNOW/Hickox, 2005
 Edward Elgar: Bournemouth Symphony Orchestra, Simon Wright The Music Makers / Sea Pictures Naxos. GRAMMY NOMINATED 2006 (Solo Vocal category)
 Edward Elgar: The Very Best of Elgar 8.552133-34
 George Frideric Handel: Giulio Cesare (Glyndebourne, 2006) – Glyndebourne Festival Opera – OAE / Christie/Opus Arte GRAMMOPHONE AWARD WINNER (Best Early Opera)
 George Frideric Handel: Heroes and Heroines – The Sixteen / Harry Christophers, Coro
 George Frideric Handel: Solomon (Solomon) Harmonia Mundi (2007 release)
 Leoš Janáček: The Cunning Little Vixen – The Innkeepers Wife, ARTHAUS DVD, 1995
 Gustav Mahler Des Knaben Wunderhorn – OCE / Herreweghe Harmonia Mundi, 2006 EDISON AWARD WINNER (Solo Vocal category)
 Gustav Mahler Das Lied von der Erde - London Philharmonic Orchestra / Yannick Nézet-Séguin - Recorded live at Southbank Centre's Royal Festival Hall, London, on 19 February 2011
 Felix Mendelssohn: Songs and Duets Vol. 3 Hyperion, 2004
 Felix Mendelssohn: Elijah – The Queen/Soprano soloist, Winged Lion, 2012
 Wolfgang Amadeus Mozart – Mass in C Minor and Haydn – Scena di Bernice – Gabrieli Consort / McCreesh DG, 2006
 Arnold Schoenberg: BBC Voices – Blood Red Carnations: Songs by Arnold Schoenberg Black Box, 2002
 John Tavener: Children of Men The Exquisite Hour – Recital Disc: Songs by Brahms, Britten, Hahn, Haydn (Eugene Asti) Signum Classics, 2006
 Robert Schumann: Songs of Love and Loss (Eugene Asti) – Chandos, 2008
 Erich Korngold: Sonett für Wien: Songs of Erich Korngold Sarah Connolly (mezzo-soprano), William Dazeley (baritone), Iain Burnside (piano) Signum Classics SIGCD160
 Jean-Philippe Rameau: Les fêtes d'Hébé (Les Arts Florissants & William Christie)- Erato, 1997

References

External links
 
 

Biographies
 Sarah Connolly (Mezzo-soprano) at Bach Cantatas Website  (Management page in former layout with detailed biography)
 Sarah Connolly at Naxos Records
 Sarah Connolly at Hyperion Records
 Sarah Connolly at Harmonia Mundi

Interviews and articles
 BBC Radio 4 Woman's Hour – Sarah Connolly (link to radio interview RAM file)
 Mezzo of the Moment – Interview October 2008
 Music Web International article on ENO production of La Clemenza di Tito, 2005
 Music Web International article on Prom 52, 2005, Julius Caesar

Media
  [Sarah Connolly (mezzo-soprano), wearing a naval uniform like those worn in the age of Nelson sings Arne's "Rule, Britannia!" during Last Night of the Proms 2009, inside the Royal Albert Hall. BBC SO's David Robertson conducts the BBC Symphony Orchestra, BBC Singers, BBC Symphony Chorus.  Although "Rule, Britannia!" had long been a fixture of the last night, this was the first time Arne's original version had been performed there.'']

1963 births
Living people
Musicians from County Durham
Alumni of the Royal College of Music
English mezzo-sopranos
20th-century British women opera singers
Operatic mezzo-sopranos
People educated at Queen Margaret's School, York
Dames Commander of the Order of the British Empire
Singers awarded knighthoods
21st-century British women opera singers